Thaumatoperla is a genus of insect in the family Eustheniidae containing four species of stonefly, all endemic to the Victorian alpine area of Australia.

Description
Thaumatoperla are large stoneflies with large pronota and wide wings, though incapable of flight.

Taxonomy
Thaumatoperla contains the following species:
 Thaumatoperla alpina Burns & Neboiss, 1957
 Thaumatoperla flaveola Burns & Neboiss, 1957
 Thaumatoperla robusta Tillyard, 1921
 Thaumatoperla timmsi Zwick, 1979

Type species: Thaumatoperla robusta Tillyard, 1921 by original designation.

References

Plecoptera
Plecoptera genera
Endemic fauna of Australia
Aquatic insects
Taxa named by Robert John Tillyard